Chowk Kumharanwala Level II Flyover also called Jinnah Chowk Flyover is located in Multan city of Pakistan, at an intersection itself called as Chowk Kumharanwala, Jinnah Chowk or Qadaffi Chowk.
Foundation stone was put by former prime minister Yousaf Raza Gillani and ground breaking of level I flyover was also done by Yousaf Raza Gillani on 26 April 2011.
It was constructed as part of Inner Ring Road Multan project.

Records
This flyover has record of being first ever grade separated level II flyover in Punjab province of Pakistan.

Cost and Dimensions
The 325-metre-long and 7.3-metre-wide Jinah Chowk level one fly over was completed in 13 months at the cost of 500 million rupees.

Roads Complexes
It is a complex intersection with six roads namely
 Khanewal Road
 National Highway 5
 New Multan Main Boulevard
 Piran Ghaib Road
 University Road
 Masoom Shah Road

Grade Separation
This flyover is grade separated and it is first level II flyover of Punjab province of Pakistan.

 There is complex of roads on ground level connecting all road to the New Multan Main Boulevard.
 Level I flyover connect Khanewal Road to the National Highway 5 towards Lahore.
 Level II flyover is one way and connect Khanewal Road with New Multan Main Boulevard. An extra one way slip entry ramp from newly created University Road also joins with the level II flyover.

See also
 Yousuf Raza Gillani Flyover
 List of flyovers in Multan
 List of flyovers in Pakistan
 List of flyovers in Lahore

References

External links
 Multan City government website 
 Aerial View Of Chowk Kumharanwala Level II Flyover Multan
 Chowk Kumharanwala Level II Flyover Multan

Buildings and structures in Multan